Sanare may refer to:

 Sanare, Burkina Faso, a village in Bam Province, Burkina Faso
 Sanare, Venezuela, a city in Lara state, Venezuela

See also
 Sanar (disambiguation)